David Keith may refer to:

David Keith (novelist) (1906–1994), pen name of American scholar Francis Steegmuller
David Keith (actor) (born 1954), American film and TV performer and director
David Keith (physicist), Canadian-born Harvard Professor of Public Policy active since 1980s
David Keith (racing driver) (1973–2020), American NASCAR driver between 2000 and 2004
David Keith (drummer) (born 1973), American drummer, composer and producer
David A. Keith, Australian botanist, ecologist and academic active since 1990s

See also

Keith David (born 1956), American actor and producer